Mr. Bill's Real Life Adventures is a 1986 comedy television film written by Walter Williams and directed by Jim Drake. The film was based on the "Mr. Bill" skits from the television show Saturday Night Live. Mr. Bill's Real Life Adventures premiered on the Showtime cable television network in the United States on September 11, 1986.

Synopsis 
An attempt to bring the "Mr. Bill" clay characters to "life" in a sitcom format, this Showtime special featured Mr. Bill (Peter Scolari), his wife (Valerie Mahaffey) and son (Christopher Burton), as well as  his next-door neighbor, Sluggo (Michael McManus), his wife (Lenore Kasdorf) and daughter (Hope Tibbetts). Although starring actors, the "Bills" were shown to be a "miniature" family, with many of the jokes revolving around the characters' small size and the challenges they faced living in a "large" human world, as well as scenarios where Mr. Bill is subjected to the various abusive situations the original Saturday Night Live character was best known for. However, in this film Sluggo is depicted more of a nuisance towards Mr. Bill than a threat. Although the audience was invited to "look out for more shows" at the end of the 43-minute film, no follow-up "Mr. Bill" shows were ever produced.

Cast 
Peter Scolari - Mr. Bill
Valerie Mahaffey - Mrs. Bill
Christopher Burton - Billy
Michael McManus - Sluggo
Lenore Kasdorf - Mrs. Sluggo
Hope Tibbetts - Junior
Shelley Duvall - Herself

References

External links 
 

1986 films
American comedy television films
Showtime (TV network) original programming
1986 comedy films
Films directed by Jim Drake (director)
1980s English-language films
1980s American films